Petrichloral (Pentaerythritol chloral) is a sedative and hypnotic chloral hydrate prodrug. It is a Schedule IV drug in the USA.

References 

Sedatives
GABAA receptor positive allosteric modulators